Cyprinivirus is a genus of viruses in the order Herpesvirales, in the family Alloherpesviridae. Freshwater eels serve as natural hosts. There are four species in this genus. Diseases associated with this genus include: hemorrhagic disease.

Species 
The genus consists of the following four species:

 Anguillid herpesvirus 1
 Cyprinid herpesvirus 1
 Cyprinid herpesvirus 2
 Cyprinid herpesvirus 3

Structure 
Viruses in Cyprinivirus are enveloped, with icosahedral and spherical to pleomorphic geometries, and T=16 symmetry. The diameter is around 200 nm. Genomes are linear and non-segmented, around 10kb in length. The genome codes for 136 proteins.

Life cycle 
Viral replication is nuclear, and is lysogenic. Entry into the host cell is achieved by attachment of the viral glycoproteins to host receptors, which mediates endocytosis. DNA-templated transcription is the method of transcription. Freshwater eel serve as the natural host. Transmission routes are passive diffusion.

References

External links 

 Viralzone: Cyprinivirus
 ICTV

Alloherpesviridae
Virus genera